Beacon House is a grade I listed townhouse at New Street, Painswick, Gloucestershire, England.

History
The Palladian house was built in 1766, possibly by John Wood the Younger.

Architecture
The three-storey, three-bay limestone front of the building is topped with a cornice and a baluster parapet. The rococo plaster of the staircase was added by William Stocking. There is extensive plasterwork throughout the house.

References

External links 

Grade I listed houses in Gloucestershire
Painswick